Xerocrassa nyeli ponsi is a subspecies of air-breathing land snail, a pulmonate gastropod mollusk in the family Geomitridae.

Distribution

This species is endemic to Spain, where it is restricted to the Balearic island of Cabrera.

References

 Bank, R. A.; Neubert, E. (2017). Checklist of the land and freshwater Gastropoda of Europe. Last update: July 16th, 2017

External links
 Hidalgo, J. G. (1878). Catalogue des mollusques terrestres des îles Baléares. Journal de Conchyliologie. 26: 213-247, pl. 9. Paris

nyeli ponsi
Molluscs of Europe
Endemic fauna of the Balearic Islands
Gastropods described in 1878